Al-Mamun Al Siyam is a Bangladeshi film actor, known for the 2012 film Ghetu Putro Komola, which was selected as the Bangladeshi entry for the Best Foreign Language Oscar at the 85th Academy Awards, but it did not make the final shortlist. Mamun is the recipient of several accolades, including National Film Awards in 2012. He has worked in Indian films, predominantly in Hindi. Debuting with bollywood film Ek villain as Aisha's friend in 2014 he has since then established a career in both Bengali and Hindi film industry.

Career
Mamun started acting debut with a television drama produced by telecommunication operator Airtel Bangladesh. In 2012 he drew a widespread attention through the lead role Ghetuputra in the film Ghetuputra Komola, produced and directed by Humayun Ahmed. His second film is Nishiddho Premer Golpo.

Filmography

Playback
 Abujh Bou (2010)
 Pahili Raja (2010)

Awards

References

External links
 
 

Living people
Male actors in Bengali cinema
Bengali male television actors
Best Child Artist National Film Award (Bangladesh) winners
1993 births